The Lake of Tunis ( Buḥayra Tūnis) is a natural lagoon located  between the Tunisian capital city of Tunis and the Gulf of Tunis (Mediterranean Sea). The lake covers a total of 37 square kilometres, in contrast to its size its depth is very shallow. It was once the natural harbour of Tunis.

History
The Tunis-Carthage connection was very important to the Romans, as it meant control over the fertile hinterland. The Romans therefore built a dam through the lake. The dam is used today as an expressway for automobiles and railway connecting Tunis to the harbour, La Goulette, and the coastal cities of Carthage, Sidi Bou Said, and La Marsa.
The northern lake includes the island of Chikly, once home to a Spanish stronghold, and now (since 1993) a nature reserve.

The lake continued to aggrade (an increase in land elevation, in this case of the lake bed, due to the deposition of sediment) during the 19th century. French colonial forces traversed the lake with a 10-kilometer long, 450-meter wide, and 6-meter deep canal.

Development
Recently , the Tunisian government and Sama Dubai of the UAE (led by Dubai Governor Mohammed bin Rashid Al Maktoum) have joint-ventured an investment agreement to develop the southern shore of the lake into a new commercial, residential and touristic center in Tunisia and the Mediterranean. Total costs of the investment, considered the biggest in Tunisia's history, will be around US$18 billion. The project should be ready in the next 10 to 15 years.

References

Tunis, Lake of
Ramsar sites in Tunisia
Tunisia geography articles needing translation from French Wikipedia